T Coronae Australis (T CrA), is a young star in the constellation Corona Australis. It has a spectral type of F0e and is surrounded by a circumstellar disk, seen edge-on.

References

Corona Australis
Herbig Ae/Be stars
Coronae Australis, T